The Silent War may refer to:

The Silent War (book), 1998 book by Frank Furedi
The Silent War (2012 film), a Hong Kong thriller film
The Silent War (2019 film), a Spanish war film
Alliance: The Silent War,  first-person shooter video game

See also 
Silent War, comic book series